Inauguration of Ulysses S. Grant may refer to: 

First inauguration of Ulysses S. Grant, 1869
Second inauguration of Ulysses S. Grant, 1873

See also